Jaskólski, feminine: Jaskólska is a Polish-language toponymic surname derived from any of the places named Jaskółki. The latter word is the plural of the Polish word jaskółka, i.e., literally means "swallows". The surname may be phonemically transcribed as Jaskulski / Jaskulska. As a Polish noble surname, it belongs to the Leszczyc coat of arms heraldic clan.

When transliterated via the Russian language, the surname accepts the forms Yaskolsky / Yaskolski (f.: Yaskolskaya), resp. Yaskulsky / Yaskulski (f.: Yaskulskaya).

Notable people with the surname include:

 Erwin Jaskulski (1902–2006), American sprinter
 Franciszek Jerzy Jaskulski (1913–1947), Polish resistance fighter
 Robert Jaskulski (1926–2002), American politician
 Waldemar Jaskulski, Polish footballer

See also
Jaskółka (disambiguation)

Polish-language surnames
Polish toponymic surnames

pl:Jaskólski